Anathallis montipelladensis is a species of orchid from Brazil first described by Frederico Carlos Hoehne in 1929. Pleurothalis montipelladensis and Specklinia montipelladensis are synonyms.

References 

montipelladensis
Endemic orchids of Brazil
Plants described in 1929